The Kenai River Brown Bears are a Tier II junior ice hockey team in the North American Hockey League based in Soldotna, Alaska. The team joined the North American Hockey League (NAHL) as an expansion team for the 2007–08 season, and since then has upgraded and added team-specific facilities to the 2,000 plus capacity Soldotna Sports Center it calls home.

On February 28, 2017, during a major slump in the Alaskan economy, years of team futility and increased travel costs, the Brown Bears announced it would cease operations at the end of the 2016–17 season. However, after a fan fundraising effort, the Brown Bears applied to the NAHL for approval to reactivate in April 2017 and was approved.

Due to the travel restrictions caused by the COVID-19 pandemic, the Brown Bears temporarily relocated home games to Breezy Point, Minnesota, for most of the 2020–21 season until mid-April 2021.

Season-by-season records

Playoffs
2009
First Round – Fairbanks Ice Dogs defeated Kenai River Brown Bears 3-games-to-0
2010
First Round – Wenatchee Wild defeated Kenai River Brown Bears 3-games-to-0
2011
Divisional Semifinals – Fairbanks Ice Dogs defeated Kenai River Brown Bears 3-games-to-0
2012
Divisional Semifinals – Fairbanks Ice Dogs defeated Kenai River Brown Bears 3-games-to-0
2013
Divisional Semifinals – Fairbanks Ice Dogs defeated Kenai River Brown Bears 3-games-to-2
2014
Divisional Semifinals – Fairbanks Ice Dogs defeated Kenai River Brown Bears 3-games-to-2
2021
Division Semifinals – Kenai River Brown Bears defeated Janesville Jets 3-games-to-1
Division Finals – Minnesota Magicians defeated Kenai River Brown Bears 3-games-to-2

Head coaches
2007–2009: Mike Flanagan
2011–2013: Oliver David
2013–2016: Geoff Beauparlant
2016–2017: Jeff Worlton
2017–2019: Josh Petrich
2019: Dan Bogdan (interim)
2019–2021: Kevin Murdock
2021: Josh Dubinsky
2021–present: Taylor Shaw (interim)

References

External links
 
 NAHL website

2007 establishments in Alaska
Ice hockey teams in Alaska
Kenai Peninsula Borough, Alaska
North American Hockey League teams
Ice hockey clubs established in 2007